Isoprednidene (developmental code name StC 407) is a synthetic glucocorticoid corticosteroid which was never marketed.

References

Diketones
Glucocorticoids
Pregnanes
Triols
Abandoned drugs
Vinylidene compounds